Sanjay Savkare is member of Bharatiya Janata Party and represents from Bhusawal Constituency. He was in NCP before joining BJP.

Education and early career

studied in bhusawal

Political career
Sanjay Savkare was member of Nationalist Congress Party represents Bhusawal in 2009.

Positions held
Guardian Minister of Jalgaon District

Within BJP

Legislative

Member, Maharashtra Legislative Assembly- 2014

See also

 Devendra Fadnavis ministry (2014–)
 Make in Maharashtra

References

Living people
Bharatiya Janata Party politicians from Maharashtra
Maharashtra MLAs 2009–2014
1970 births
Maharashtra MLAs 2014–2019
People from Bhusawal